Al Bayda Governorate, also spelt Al-Baidhah or Beida, is one of the governorates (muhafazat) of Yemen. It is located near the centre of the country, around the town of Al Bayda. Its population, according to the 2004 Yemeni census, was 571,778.

Geography

Adjacent governorates

 Shabwah Governorate (east)
 Abyan Governorate (south, southeast)
 Lahij Governorate (south)
 Dhale Governorate (south, southwest)
 Ibb Governorate (west)
 Dhamar Governorate (west)
 Sanaa Governorate (north)
 Marib Governorate (north)

Districts
Al Bayda Governorate is divided into the following 20 districts. These districts are further divided into sub-districts, and then further subdivided into villages:

 Al A'rsh District
 Al Bayda District
 Al Bayda City District
 Al Malagim District
 Al Quraishyah District
 Ar Ryashyyah District
 As Sawadiyah District
 As Sawma'ah District
 Ash Sharyah District
 At Taffah District
 Az Zahir District
 Dhi Na'im District
 Maswarah District
 Mukayras District
 Na'man District
 Nati' District
 Rada'a District
 Radman Al Awad District
 Sabah District
 Wald Rabi' District

Governors

References

 

 
Governorates of Yemen